Amphibacillus  is a Gram-positive, spore-forming, rod-shaped and facultatively anaerobic genus of bacteria from the family of Bacillaceae. Amphibacillus have a low GC-content.

References

Further reading 
 
 
 
 
 
 

Bacillaceae
Bacteria genera